Carpilioidea is a superfamily of crabs containing a single extant family, Carpiliidae and three extinct families. The modern range of the family includes the Indo-Pacific, Western Atlantic and Caribbean Sea. The fossil record of the group extends back at least as far as the Paleocene.

Genera

Carpiliidae Ortmann, 1893
 Carpilius A. G. Desmarest, 1823
 Eocarpilius Blow & Manning, 1996
 Holcocarcinus Withers, 1924
 Ocalina Rathbun, 1929
 Palaeocarpilius A. Milne-Edwards, 1862
 Paraocalina Beschin, Busulini, De Angeli & Tessier, 2007
 Proxicarpilius Collins & Morris, 1978
Paleoxanthopsidae Schweitzer, 2003
 Jakobsenius Schweitzer, 2005
 Lobulata Schweitzer, Feldmann & Gingerich, 2004
 Palaeoxantho Bishop, 1986
 Palaeoxanthopsis Beurlen, 1958
 Paraverrucoides Schweitzer, 2003
 Remia Schweitzer, 2003
 Rocacarcinus Schweitzer, 2005
 Verrucoides Vega, Cosma, Coutiño, Feldmann, Nyborg, Schweitzer & Waugh, 2001
Tumidocarcinidae Schweitzer, 2005
 Baricarcinus Casadío, De Angeli, Feldmann, Garassino, Hetler, Parras & Schweitzer, 2004
 Cyclocorystes Bell, 1858
 Lobonotus A. Milne-Edwards, 1863
 Nitotacarcinus Schweitzer, Artal, Van Bakel, Jagt & Karasawa, 2007
 Paratumidocarcinus Martins-Neto, 2001
 Pulalius Schweitzer, Feldmann, Tucker & Berglund, 2000
 Titanocarcinus A. Milne-Edwards, 1863
 Tumidocarcinus Glaessner, 1960
 Xanthilites Bell, 1858
Zanthopsidae Vía, 1959
 Fredericia Collins & Jakobsen, 2003
 Harpactocarcinus A. Milne-Edwards, 1862
 Harpactoxanthopsis Vía, 1959
 Martinetta Blow & Manning, 1997
 Neozanthopsis Schweitzer, 2003
 Zanthopsis M’Coy, 1849

References

External links

Crabs
Extant Paleocene first appearances